Paul Lévy may refer to:
 Paul Lévy (mathematician) (1886–1971), French mathematician
 Paul Levy (journalist) (born 1941), US/British journalist and author
 Paul F. Levy, former president and CEO of Beth Israel Deaconess Medical Center
 Paul M. G. Lévy (1910–2002), Belgian journalist and professor
 General Levy (Paul Levy, born 1971), London born ragga vocalist
 Paul Bern (Paul Levy, 1889–1932), German-American film director, screenwriter and producer
 Paul Lhérie (Paul Lévy, 1844–1937), French opera singer